Clinton E. Crosier is a retired United States Air Force major general who last served as director of space force planning in the Office of the Chief of Space Operations. After retiring, he was hired to lead Amazon Web Services' new Aerospace and Satellite Solutions.

Crosier attended Iowa State University on an Air Force ROTC scholarship. He was commissioned and entered the Air Force in 1988 after receiving a degree in aerospace engineering.

Assignments 
 January 1988–September 1991, operations management officer and squadron section commander, 7th Airborne Command and Control Squadron, Keesler Air Force Base, Mississippi
 September 1991–February 1992, student, Undergraduate Space Training, Lowry AFB, Colorado
 February 1992–February 1995, chief of operations plans and requirements, deputy chief of standardization and evaluations, flight commander, instructor, 3rd Space Operations Squadron, Falcon AFB, Colorado
 February 1995–July 1995, student, Intercontinental Ballistic Missile Initial Qualification Training, Vandenberg AFB, California
 July 1995–September 1997, operations support flight commander, instructor, crew commander, 320th Missile Squadron, F.E. Warren AFB, Wyoming
 September 1997–July 1998, chief of current operations and training, 90th Operations Support Squadron, F.E. Warren AFB, Wyoming
 July 1998–January 1999, Congressional liaison officer, Headquarters Air Force, Office of Legislative Liaison, the Pentagon, Arlington, Virginia
 January 1999–January 2000, legislative fellow, U.S. Senate, Washington, D.C.
 January 2000–July 2001, space and missile advisor, Secretary of the Air Force Action Group, Office of the Secretary of the Air Force, the Pentagon, Arlington, Virginia
 July 2001–July 2003, commander, 2d Space Launch Squadron, Vandenberg AFB, California
 July 2003–June 2004, student, Naval War College, Newport, Rhode Island
 June 2004–May 2006, director of preparation and planning, Under Secretary of Defense for Intelligence, Office of the Secretary of Defense, the Pentagon, Arlington, Virginia
 June 2006–July 2008, commander, 50th Operations Group, Schriever AFB, Colorado
 July 2008–June 2009, deputy director of plans and programs, Headquarters, Air Force Space Command, Peterson AFB, Colorado
 June 2009–May 2011, commander, 460th Space Wing, Buckley AFB, Colorado
 May 2011–July 2012, director of Space Forces, U.S. Air Forces Central, Al Udeid AB, Qatar
 July 2012–January 2014, director of strategic plans, programs, requirements, and assessments, Headquarters Air Force Global Strike Command, Barksdale AFB, Louisiana
 January 2014–June 2015, deputy director, Global Operations Directorate (J3), U.S. Strategic Command, Offutt AFB, Nebraska
 June 2015–July 2017, director of plans and policy (J5), U.S. Strategic Command, Offutt AFB, Nebraska
 July 2017–December 2017, director of operational capability requirements, Deputy Chief of Staff for Strategic Plans and Requirements, Headquarters U.S. Air Force, the Pentagon, Arlington, Virginia
 December 2017–December 2018, director of Air Force warfighting integration capability, Deputy Chief of Staff for Strategic Plans and Requirements, Headquarters U.S. Air Force, the Pentagon, Arlington, Virginia
 December 2018–February 2019, deputy, deputy chief of staff for strategy, integration and requirements, Headquarters U.S. Air Force, the Pentagon, Arlington, Virginia
 February 2019–October 2020, director of Space Force planning, Office of the Chief of Space Operations, U.S. Space Force, the Pentagon, Arlington, Virginia

Awards and decorations

Effective dates of promotion

References 

Living people
Year of birth missing (living people)
Place of birth missing (living people)
Office of the Chief of Space Operations personnel
United States Air Force generals
Major generals
Recipients of the Legion of Merit
Iowa State University alumni